Zubeldia is a surname. Notable people with the surname include:

Emiliana de Zubeldia (1888–1987), Spanish pianist and composer
Haimar Zubeldia (born 1977), Spanish professional road racing cyclist
Joseba Zubeldia (born in Usurbil, Basque Country), Spanish professional road bicycle racer
Luis Zubeldía (born 1981), Argentine former footballer and current coach of Club Atlético Lanús
Igor Zubeldia (born 1997), Spanish footballer who plays for Real Sociedad